Bright Yellow Bright Orange is the eighth album by Australian indie rock group The Go-Betweens, released in February 2003 on the Trifekta Records label. It was nominated at the 2003 ARIA Music Awards for Best Adult Contemporary Album, but lost to John Farnham for The Last Time.

Track listing

The first pressing of the Jetset version of the CD, that was available in some US stores, included a bonus disk.

Personnel

 Robert Forster - vocals, electric and acoustic guitar, slide, Hammond organ, piano
 Grant McLennan – vocals, electric and acoustic guitar
 Adele Pickvance – electric and upright bass, keyboards, vocals
 Glenn Thompson – drums, electric guitar, Farfisa organ, keyboards, vocals
 Hope Csutoros – violin
 Helen Mountfort – cello
 David Chesworth – string arrangement

References

2003 albums
The Go-Betweens albums
Jetset Records albums